Etilefrine is a cardiac stimulant used as an antihypotensive. It is a sympathomimetic amine of the 3-hydroxy-phenylethanolamine series used in treating orthostatic hypotension of neurological, cardiovascular, endocrine or metabolic origin. Intravenous infusion of this compound increases cardiac output, stroke volume, venous return and blood pressure in man and experimental animals, suggesting stimulation of both α and β adrenergic receptors. However, in vitro studies indicate that etilefrine has a much higher affinity for β1 (cardiac) than for β2 adrenoreceptors.

Intravenous etilefrine increases the pulse rate, cardiac output, stroke volume, central venous pressure and mean arterial pressure of healthy individuals. Peripheral vascular resistance falls during the infusion of 1–8 mg etilefrine but begins to rise at higher dosage. Marked falls in pulse rate, cardiac output, stroke volume and peripheral bloodflow, accompanied by rises in mean arterial pressure, occur when etilefrine is infused after administration of intravenous propranolol 2,5 mg. These findings indicate that etilefrine has both β1 and α1 adrenergic effects in man.

References

External links 
 
 

Alpha-1 adrenergic receptor agonists
Alpha-2 adrenergic receptor agonists
Beta-adrenergic agonists
Cardiac stimulants
Phenylethanolamines
Phenols